Urman (Bashkir and ) is a rural locality (a selo) and the administrative centre of Urmansky Selsoviet, Iglinsky District, Bashkortostan, Russia. The population was 2,877 as of 2010. There are 26 streets.

Geography 
Urman is located 44 km east of Iglino (the district's administrative centre) by road. Novy is the nearest rural locality.

References 

Rural localities in Iglinsky District